Gaby Tanguy (16 July 1929 – 31 January 1981) was a French freestyle swimmer. She competed in three events at the 1952 Summer Olympics.

References

External links
 

1929 births
1981 deaths
French female freestyle swimmers
Olympic swimmers of France
Swimmers at the 1952 Summer Olympics
Place of birth missing